Seán Mór Seoighe was an Irish steward, stonemason, and builder. He was the ancestor of many of the Joyce families of County Kerry, County Limerick, and County Cork, including that of the author James Joyce, Patrick Weston Joyce and Robert Dwyer Joyce.

Biography
Seoighe came from Connemara in County Galway, and relocated to County Kerry by about 1680 to work for William FitzMaurice, 20th Baron Kerry. His move may have been facilitated by the O'Malley family of Mayo, who had connections with the FitzMaurice family. An alternative tradition of the Joyces near Fermoy indicates that Seoighe came from the Kylemore-Ballynakill area near Letterfrack, and moved to Kerry along with his brother.

Seoighe became household steward for William FitzMaurice, who lived at Lixnaw, on the Brick river, south-west of Listowel. He appears to have been hired by FitzMaurice on the basis of being a stonemason and builder. Seoige oversaw the transformation of Lixnaw Old Court and its associated buildings, and was given land to settle in the area. Over the subsequent six generations, the Joyce family proliferated and spread beyond Kerry into the neighbouring counties of Limerick and Cork.

Family tree

   Seán Mór Seoighe, fl. 1680.
      |
      |
      Risteard Caol Seoige
      |
      |
      Bernard Rua Joyce, fl. 1750.
    = Brid MacAuliffe of Newmarket, County Cork.
      |
      |
      Gearoid Mór Joyce of Ballyorgan, Athlacca, Co. Limerick.
    = Mary Ann Hogan
      |
      |_ _ _ _ _ _ _ _ _ _ _[exact relationship uncertain] _ _ _ _ _ _ _ _ _ _ _ _ _ _
      |                                                                              |
      |                                                                              |
      Roibeard an Gaelgoir Joyce, died 1828.                                         John Joyce
    = Ann Howard, fl. 1783.                                                         =?
      |                                                                              |
      |                                                                              |
      Garrett Joyce of Glenosheen, born 1796.                                        George Joyce, born c. 1776, south Co. Limerick.
    = Elizabeth O'Dwyer.                                                            =?
      |                                                                              |
      |__                            |
      |                   |    |                        |                            James Joyce, born c. 1800, of Rose Cottage, Cork.
      |                   |    |                        |                          = Ann McCann `of Ulster'
      Michael (fl. 1898)  John Patrick Weston Joyce Robert Dwyer Joyce       |
      |                                                                              |
      |                                                                              James Augustine Joyce (only son), b. 1827, Fermoy.
      W.B. Joyce                                                                   = 
      |                                                                              |
      |                                                                              |
      Thomas Michael Joyce (1896-1958) of Pearse Street, Dublin.                     John Stanislaus Joyce (only son), 1849–1931
                                                                                   = May Murray
                                                                                     |
      ___|
      |                 |           |       |        |        |     |       |          |
      |                 |           |       |        |        |     |       |          |
   James Joyce    Margaret    John    George   Eileen   May   Eva   Florence   Mabel
     1882–1941.

References

Sources
John Stanislaus Joyce – The Voluminous Life and Genius of James Joyce's Father, by John Wyse Jackson and Peter Costello, St. Martin's Press, London, 1998.

17th-century Irish people
People from County Galway
People from County Limerick